Otočac is a town in Croatia, former bishopric and present Latin Catholic titular see. It lies in the northwestern part of Lika region, in the Gacka river valley. The population of the administrative area of the Town of Otočac was 9,778 in 2011, with 4,240 in Otočac itself, the majority of whom were Croats (91%).

Name
The town is known as Otocsán in Hungarian, Ottocio in Italian, and Ottocium in Latin. In historical sources, the name has been rendered as Ottochaz (German and English), Ottocaz (Italian and German), and Ottotschaz, Ottotschan, & Ottocsaz (German).

History
Otočac was named after the early Croatian parish. The text of the famous Baška Tablet (around 1100) says that the church of St. Nicholas in Otočac was part of the order community with the Church of St. Lucy, Jurandvor on the island of Krk. From 1300 on, it belonged to the estate of the Frankopan family. Sigismund Frankopan (1461–1535) founded a diocese there (see below). The settlement with a defence tower, at a bend in the river Gacka, was protected by a towered fort. After the fort's demolition in 1829, only parts remained preserved. To provide a safer defence, a Renaissance-era fortress ("Fortica") was built in 1619, with a triangular layout of cylindrical towers.

The Baroque parish church of the Holy Trinity, erected in 1684 (restored in 1774), is a large one-nave building with rounded sanctuary; three side chapels are on each side of the nave. The bell tower rises from the main front. The late baroque and classicist furnishings of the church include seven altars, a pulpit, baptismal font and sepulchral slabs from the 18th century.

From 1746, Otočac was the headquarters of a regiment (Ottotschaner Grenz-Infanterie Regiment N°II) of the Croatian Military Frontier, (Croatian Vojna Krajina). A number of harmonious, simple, mostly two-story houses originate from this period. Until 1918, Otočac was part of the Austrian monarchy (part of the Kingdom of Croatia-Slavonia subordinate to the Kingdom of Hungary after the compromise of 1867). In the late 19th century and early 20th century, Otočac was part of the Lika-Krbava County of Croatia-Slavonia.

During the World War II Genocide of Serbs by the Ustaše, Otočac was the site of the slaughter of some 331 Serbs in late April 1941. The victims were forced to dig their own graves before being hacked to death with axes. Among the victims was the local Orthodox priest and his son. The former was made to recite prayers for the dying as his son was killed. The priest was then tortured, his hair and beard was pulled out, eyes gouged out before he was skinned alive.

During the Croatian War of Independence the city was occupied by Serbian forces, but was later liberated by the Croats. It was later defended by the boškarini of the 154th Brigade HV, which in the following years visited the city. An armistice agreement was signed in January 1992, but the surroundings of Otočac were finally liberated only in 1995.

Ecclesiastical History

A bishopric was established in 1460, on territory split from the Roman Catholic Diocese of Senj, which local estate owner Sigismund Frankopan (1461–1535) founded at the church of St. Nicholas and Jelena (née Keglević), widow of Juraj Mikuličić, who was a member of the community of the Divine Holy Spirit in Rome, gave to the church three parcels of land. Initially it was suffragan of the Metropolitan Archdiocese of Salona, later of the Archdiocese of Split. In 1534 it was suppressed and its territory returned to its mother diocese of Senj.

Residential Suffragan Bishops
 Biagio Nicolai (1460.06.04 – death 1492?)
 Giovanni Chericato, Crosier Canons (O.Cruc.) (1492.05.09 – 1493.08.16), later Bishop of Kotor (Montenegro) (1493.08.16 – death 1514)
 Vincenzo de Andreis (1493.09.06 – 1520?)
 Pietro de Andreis (1520.10.19 – 1534?)

Titular see 
It was nominally restored in 1933 as a Latin titular bishopric.

It had had the following incumbents, so far the fitting Episcopal (lowest) rank :
 Patrick Webster, Benedictine Order (O.S.B.) (1969.06.26 – 1970.03.07) as Auxiliary Bishop of Diocese of Saint George’s in Grenada (Grenada) (1969.06.26 – 1970.03.07) and as Apostolic Administrator of Saint George’s in Grenada (1969.08.05 – 1970.03.07), succeeding as Bishop of Saint George’s in Grenada (1970.03.07 – 1974.11.18), later Metropolitan Archbishop of Castries (Saint Lucia) (1974.11.18 – 1979.05.10)
 Maurice Paul Delorme, Prado (1975.10.02 – death 2012.12.27) as Auxiliary Bishop of Archdiocese of Lyon (France) (1975.10.02 – retired 1994.12.03) and as emeritate
 Joaquím Humberto Pinzón Güiza, Consolata Missionaries (I.M.C.) (2013.02.21 – ...), Apostolic Vicar of Puerto Leguízamo–Solano (Colombia).

Demographics 
According to 2011 census, the Town of Otočac had 9,778 inhabitants, of whom 91.18% were Croats and 7.25% were Serbs. Croats in the vicinity of Otočac form two groups, those who speak Chakavian dialect and Bunjevci, who speak Shtokavian dialect with an Ikavian accent. Serbs form a majority in the villages of Gorići and Staro Selo. The settlement of Otočac itself had population of 4,240.

Before the Croatian War of Independence, the 1991 census lists the greater municipality of Otočac as having 24,992 inhabitants, with 16,355 Croats (65.44%) and 7,781 Serbs (31.13%).

Geography 
Otočac is located in the western part of Gacko Polje, the karst field of centrally located Gacka river, located between Velebit and Mala Kapela, at an elevation of 459m. The town lies to the southeast of Senj, northwest of Gospić and west of Plitvice.

There are two town sections, the Upper Town and Lower Town.

Settlements

Gallery

Notable natives and residents 
 Jure Francetić
 Stjepan Jovanović
 Božidar Maljković
 Julius Rajkovic

See also 
 List of Catholic dioceses in Croatia
 Fortica Fortress in Otočac

References

Sources and external links 

 
 GCatholic

Cities and towns in Croatia
Populated places in Lika-Senj County